Vexillum moelleri is a species of small sea snail, marine gastropod mollusk in the family Costellariidae, the ribbed miters.

Description

Distribution
This species occurs in the Pacific Ocean off Hawaii, Fiji, Samoa, Tahiti, the Cook Islands and the Tuamotu Islands.

References

 Turner H. (2001) Katalog der Familie Costellariidae Macdonald 1860 (Gastropoda: Prosobranchia: Muricoidea). Hackenheim: Conchbooks. 100 pp.

moelleri
Gastropods described in 1840